American Crime may refer to:
 American Crime (film), 2004 film
 American Crime (TV series), 2015 ABC TV series

See also
 An American Crime, 2007 film
 American Crime Story, 2016 FX TV series
 Crime in the United States